Eco Park metro station may refer to:

 Eco Park metro station (Kolkata)
 Eco Park metro station (Nagpur)

See also 

 Eco Park (disambiguation)